Los Olivos (Spanish for "the olive trees") is an unincorporated community in the Santa Ynez Valley of Santa Barbara County, California, United States. Tourism is popular in this rural area which is an agricultural region with an emphasis on wine grapes. For statistical purposes, the United States Census Bureau has defined Los Olivos as a census-designated place (CDP). The population was 1,132 at the 2010 census. The ZIP Code is 93441, and the community is within the area code 805.

History
Sometime around 1880, on a bluff overlooking Alamo Pintado Creek, just north of the town of Ballard, a two-story house was built, with a wide, covered front porch and neatly symmetrical arched windows in the center gable, situated on prime farmland. It became the property of twenty-two-year-old Alden March Boyd, of Albany, New York, when he paid $8,000 for "157 acres, more or less, together with the dwelling house," in 1885. He planted five thousand olive trees, and called it Rancho De Los Olivos.  The 1880s were a boom time for California. On November 16, 1887, the Pacific Coast Railway line extension from Los Alamos was completed. The developers of the narrow-gauge railway first named their town El Olivar, then El Olivos, and finally Los Olivos, after Boyd's nearby ranch.

Los Olivos was connected by the narrow gauge railroad to points north as far as San Luis Obispo until the train made its last run in 1934. The southern terminus of the railroad was in front of Mattei's Tavern, where a stagecoach line continued over San Marcos Pass into Santa Barbara.

Geography
Los Olivos is one of five communities (with Ballard, Buellton, Solvang, and Santa Ynez) that make up the Santa Ynez Valley. The census definition of the area was created by the Census Bureau for statistical purposes and may not precisely correspond to local understanding of the area with the same name. The town is near SR 154, a scenic road from Santa Barbara over San Marcos Pass, through the coastal Santa Ynez Mountains.

Climate
Under the Köppen Climate Classification, "dry-summer subtropical" climates are often referred to as "Mediterranean". Los Olivos has a mean yearly temperature of 61.6 °F (16.4 °C). The average high temperature in the summer months is 92 °F (33.3 °C), while the average low temperature in the winter months is 39.5 °F (4.2 °C). Summers are dry with little to no rain falling from June through September. Winters are mild and wet with the majority of the yearly precipitation (nearly 80%) falling from December through March.

Demographics
The 2010 United States Census reported that Los Olivos had a population of 1,132. The racial makeup of Los Olivos was 1,049 (92.7%) White, 1 (0.1%) African American, 4 (0.4%) Native American, 12 (1.1%) Asian, 5 (0.4%) Pacific Islander, 40 (3.5%) from other races, and 21 (1.9%) from two or more races. Hispanic or Latino of any race were 125 persons (11.0%).

The Census reported that 1,132 people (100% of the population) lived in households, 0 (0%) lived in non-institutionalized group quarters, and 0 (0%) were institutionalized.

There were 460 households, out of which 141 (30.7%) had children under the age of 18 living in them, 276 (60.0%) were opposite-sex married couples living together, 36 (7.8%) had a female householder with no husband present, 15 (3.3%) had a male householder with no wife present.  There were 16 (3.5%) unmarried opposite-sex partnerships, and 5 (1.1%) same-sex married couples or partnerships; 109 households (23.7%) were made up of individuals, and 35 (7.6%) had someone living alone who was 65 years of age or older. The average household size was 2.46.  There were 327 families (71.1% of all households); the average family size was 2.90.

The population was spread out, with 247 people (21.8%) under the age of 18, 67 people (5.9%) aged 18 to 24, 203 people (17.9%) aged 25 to 44, 441 people (39.0%) aged 45 to 64, and 174 people (15.4%) who were 65 years of age or older.  The median age was 48.0 years. For every 100 females, there were 97.9 males.  For every 100 females age 18 and over, there were 92.0 males.

The homeowner vacancy rate was 0.3%; the rental vacancy rate was 2.7%.  814 people (71.9% of the population) lived in owner-occupied housing units and 318 people (28.1%) lived in rental housing units.

Economy and tourism
Los Olivos is known for its wineries and tasting rooms. Starting in Los Olivos and stretching north is the Foxen Canyon Wine Trail.

There are a number of large thoroughbred horse ranches in the area. Mattei's Tavern, a former stagecoach stop, is a restaurant.

Education
The Los Olivos School District operates Los Olivos Elementary School.

There are two private college-prep schools, Dunn School and Midland School.  Dunn School is located along SR 154 and has both boarding and day students.  Midland School is located on Figueroa Mountain Road and has only boarding students.

In popular culture
In May 1986, Los Olivos was used as the location setting for the fictional town of "Mayberry" in the made-for-TV movie Return to Mayberry, based on the popular 1960s sitcom The Andy Griffith Show. Several locations in Los Olivos were featured in the 2004 movie Sideways. The Los Olivos Grand Hotel, built in 1985, is now Fess Parker's Wine Country Inn, owned by the family of former Daniel Boone and Davy Crockett star Fess Parker (1924–2010). Parker and his wines were featured on the NBC daytime drama Santa Barbara (first episode of Season Two) of James May and Oz Clarke's Big Wine Adventure. Episodes of The Bachelor were filmed in Los Olivos.

Portions of the 1983 video for the song "Say Say Say", with Michael Jackson and Paul McCartney, were filmed at Sycamore Ranch,  from the town. According to La Toya Jackson, the McCartneys were staying at Sycamore Ranch during the filming. At the time, Jackson expressed interest in someday buying the property. In 1988, he would do so, renaming it Neverland Ranch.

Notable people
Various celebrities have called this area home, including Cheryl Ladd, Noah Wyle, David Crosby, Bo Derek, Kelly Le Brock, Val Bisoglio, Steven Seagal, John Forsythe, Ray Stark, Robert Cray, and David Hasselhoff.

References

External links 

 Los Olivos website

Census-designated places in California
Census-designated places in Santa Barbara County, California
Santa Ynez Valley